Thomas Charles Nelson (1888–16 March 1954) was a unionist politician in Northern Ireland.

Nelson grew up in County Fermanagh, where he became the owner of a painting and decorating business, and served with the B Specials. He joined the Ulster Unionist Party and was elected to the Senate of Northern Ireland in 1945, serving until the 1949 Northern Ireland general election, when he was elected in Enniskillen and resigned his seat in the Senate. Nelson held his seat at the 1953 general election, but died early in 1954.

References

1888 births
1954 deaths
Members of the House of Commons of Northern Ireland 1949–1953
Members of the House of Commons of Northern Ireland 1953–1958
Members of the Senate of Northern Ireland 1945–1949
Ulster Unionist Party members of the House of Commons of Northern Ireland
Members of the House of Commons of Northern Ireland for County Fermanagh constituencies
Ulster Unionist Party members of the Senate of Northern Ireland